Kinalur inscription (1083 AD) is a lost Jain record from Kinalur, around 30 km north-east of Calicut, in north Kerala. The inscription describes the provisions made by Arappan Kunchi, the chieftain of Kurumpurai-nadu, for "Kunavaynallur Vijayaragishwaram Jain Temple".

The old Malayalam record, in Vattezhuthu with some Grantha characters, reveals the original name of Kinalur as Kunavaynallur. It seems that Kunavaynallur was named after Thirukkunavay Shrine, another lost Jain temple near Kodungallur.  The inscription was engraved on both sides of a single granite slab in site of the ruined (now lost) Kinalur Jain Temple. The estampage can be found in Government Epigraphist's Office, Mysore.

 The record is dated in "Thiru Kaliya Padara's Consecration/Installation Year 189" (temple era) with Jupiter in Makaram, month of Medam, Wednesday and Avittam star (=1083 AD).
Arappan Kunchi the Kurumpurai  (the chieftain of Kurumpurai-nadu) donated lands to Kunavaynallur (Jain temple/palli) and leased them out to Chathan Arukkadi of Tiruvanchikkalam, and Kuntan Chirunankai and Chathan Chirukanthan (for the below provision).
 Provision is made for Thiruppali Shanthi (routine worship), Kudai (umbrella), Chanthanam, Pallithamam (garland of the deity), Nanda-villakku (permanent temple lamp), Akkiram (Brahmin feeding) and Koothu (temple dance) by Arappan Kunchi the Kurumpurai.
 Manukulai-chekara-nallur (Jain temple/palli) is mentioned.
 Munnutruvar, the Three Hundred (probably the second Hundred of Kurumpurai-nadu), and Muvayiravar (the Three Thousand) are mentioned. Both have to "guarantee regular payment after removing obstacles".

References 

11th-century inscriptions
Vatteluttu
Malayalam inscriptions
Kerala history inscriptions